Among the Missing may refer to:

 Among the Missing (Richard Laymon), a 1999 novel by Richard Laymon
Among the Missing, a 2001 collection of short-stories by Dan Chaon
 Among the Missing (film), a 1934 drama starring Richard Cromwell